Shirley D. Peterson is an American lawyer, businesswoman and former college president. In 1992, she became the first female Commissioner of Internal Revenue, or commissioner of the Internal Revenue Service.

Biography

Early life
She graduated from Bryn Mawr College and received a J.D. from the New York University School of Law.

Career
She joined the law firm of Steptoe & Johnson in 1969, and was a partner from 1979 to 1989, and from 1993 to 1994. In 1989, she was appointed by President George H. W. Bush as Assistant Attorney General in the Tax Division of the United States Department of Justice, and from 1992 to 1993, she served as Commissioner of the Internal Revenue Service. She sat on the Board of Trustees of the National Legal Center for the Public Interest.

From 1995 to 2000, she served as President of Hood College in Frederick, Maryland. She sat on the Board of Trustees of her alma mater, Bryn Mawr College, from 1994 to 2007, and she is currently a Trustee Emerita. She has served as Chair of the Commission on Government and Public Affairs of the American Council on Education.

She sits on the Boards of Directors of the Goodyear Tire and Rubber Company (since 2004), AK Steel Holding (since 2004) and Wolverine World Wide. She has served on the boards of Champion Enterprises (2004-2010), DWS Mutual Funds (1995-2008), Federal-Mogul (2002-2007), and Bethlehem Steel.

References

Living people
Bryn Mawr College alumni
New York University School of Law alumni
New Jersey lawyers
Hood College faculty
Goodyear Tire and Rubber Company people
Bethlehem Steel people
Year of birth missing (living people)
American women academics
20th-century American lawyers
20th-century American women lawyers
20th-century American politicians
20th-century American women politicians
21st-century American lawyers
21st-century American women lawyers
Heads of universities and colleges in the United States
Women heads of universities and colleges